Thomas Bryant Buck III (March 2, 1938 – January 2, 2020) was an American politician and lawyer.

Buck was born in Columbus, Georgia and graduated from Columbus High School in 1955. He served in the United States Army in 1963 and 1964. Buck received his bachelor's and law degrees from Emory University in 1959 and 1962. Buck practiced law in Columbus, Georgia. He was a member of the Georgia House of Representatives from 1966 to 2004. He was a member of the Democratic party. Buck served on the Columbus City Council for a brief time after he left the Georgia General Assembly. Buck died at Columbus Hospice in Columbus, Georgia.

References

|-

|-

|-

|-

|-

1938 births
2020 deaths
People from Columbus, Georgia
Emory University alumni
Military personnel from Georgia (U.S. state)
Georgia (U.S. state) lawyers
Georgia (U.S. state) city council members
Democratic Party members of the Georgia House of Representatives
21st-century American politicians